The 1937 All-Ireland Minor Hurling Championship was the tenth staging of the All-Ireland Minor Hurling Championship since its establishment by the Gaelic Athletic Association in 1928.

Kilkenny entered the championship as the defending champions.

On 5 September 1937 Cork won the championship following an 8-5 to 0-2 defeat of Kilkenny in the All-Ireland final. This was their second All-Ireland title and their first in nine championship seasons.

Results

All-Ireland Minor Hurling Championship

Semi-finals

Final

Championship statistics

Miscellaneous

 Cork became the third team after Tipperary and Kilkenny to win more than one All-Ireland Championship title.

External links
 All-Ireland Minor Hurling Championship: Roll Of Honour

Minor
All-Ireland Minor Hurling Championship